The 1986 California Secretary of State election was held on November 4, 1986. Democratic incumbent March Fong Eu defeated Republican nominee Bruce Nestande with 68.84% of the vote.

Primary elections
Primary elections were held on June 3, 1986.

Republican primary

Candidates
Bruce Nestande, former State Assemblyman
Ralph E. Winkler
Mike Cyrus

Results

General election

Candidates
Major party candidates
March Fong Eu, Democratic
Bruce Nestande, Republican

Other candidates
Gloria Garcia, Peace and Freedom
Richard Winger, Libertarian
Theresa F. Dietrich, American Independent

Results

References

1986
Secretary of State
California